Emakhandeni–Entumbane is a constituency of the National Assembly of the Parliament of Zimbabwe. It is currently represented by Dingilizwe Tshuma of the Movement for Democratic Change Alliance.

Members

Election results

References 

Parliamentary constituencies in Zimbabwe